Michelle Renee Clunie (born November 7, 1969) is an American actress and former ballet dancer. A native of Portland, Oregon, Clunie studied ballet from an early age, earning a scholarship at the Academy of Professional Ballet. In 1992, she starred in a Los Angeles-based production of A Comedy of Eros, for which she won a Drama-Logue Award for Best Actress, before making her film debut in the slasher film Jason Goes to Hell: The Final Friday (1993).

Clunie gained international attention for her portrayal of Melanie Marcus on Showtime's critically acclaimed series Queer as Folk (2000–2005). She later starred as Ellen Beals on Make It or Break It (2010–2011) and as Mrs. Finch on MTV’s Teen Wolf (2015–2017).

Early life
Clunie was born November 7, 1969 in Portland, Oregon. As a child, she studied ballet, tap, jazz, and violin. Clunie attended Portland's David Douglas High School, graduating in 1987.

She was awarded a scholarship to The Academy of Professional Ballet where she studied and apprenticed throughout her teenage years. At 19 years old she sold her violin for $200 and moved to Los Angeles, California to pursue an acting career.

Career
In 1992, Clunie made her Los Angeles stage debut in Dean Orion's A Comedy of Eros performed at the Skylight Theatre, which earned her a Drama-Logue Award for Best Actress.

Additional stage highlights include her portrayal of Abby in Neil LaBute's West Coast premiere of The Mercy Seat at the Ford Theatre, for which she won the Backstage Readers Best Performance Award, and the world premiere and Off-Broadway production of US, written and performed by Clunie at New York City's Lion Theatre at Theatre Row.

In 1995, she was cast in the Academy Award-winning The Usual Suspects and shortly thereafter played a supporting role in Lost & Found. She became a series regular on The Jeff Foxworthy Show and guest starred on ER, The Tony Danza Show, House M.D., Without a Trace, NCIS, among several others.

She played Melanie Marcus in the US adaption of Queer as Folk and the biology teacher, Mrs. Finch, on MTV’s Teen Wolf.

Personal life
In October 2014 it was announced Clunie was expecting a child with director Bryan Singer, and in January 2015 she gave birth to their son.

Filmography

Film

Television

References

External links

 
Michelle Clunie website

1969 births
American female dancers
American dancers
American film actresses
American television actresses
Living people
Actresses from Portland, Oregon
David Douglas High School alumni
20th-century American actresses
21st-century American actresses